Flufftails (genus Sarothrura) are small birds related to rails and finfoots. There are nine species, seven of which are distributed across sub-Saharan Africa, with the remaining two in Madagascar. The genus was long placed with the rail family Rallidae, but is now placed in the family Sarothruridae, along with three other species of wood rails (genus Canirallus).

Description
The group's common name is derived from the short tail which has degraded fluffy feathers. All species except the white-winged flufftail display sexual dimorphism in their plumage but not their size.

Distribution and habitat
Flufftails are highly secretive and seldom observed. Two species, the buff-spotted flufftail and the white-spotted flufftail, are inhabitants of dense forests, while the remaining species are found in deep grasslands and marshes. One species, the streaky-breasted flufftail, is known to be migratory. It is uncertain whether other species are as well; the white-winged flufftail may breed in Ethiopia and winter in South Africa but this is not known for certain.

Behaviour
The breeding behaviour of the flufftails has not been observed for many species. Many species breed in the wet season. All species are highly vocal during the breeding season, with repertoires including duets. In the Madagascar flufftail the courtship behaviour consists of duetting, nest building (which is undertaken by the male), nest visits by the female, and copulation. Flufftails build domed nests; the nest of the Madagascar flufftail is positioned high above the ground in vines, and the nest of the white-winged flufftail is placed in reeds over waterlogged ground. The eggs of all the species that have been studied are white, unlike most rails. The chicks are covered in black down at birth and have a slightly coloured bill; adult plumage is quickly attained in most species. Both parents care for the chicks.

Status and conservation 
Two species are currently considered endangered by the IUCN, the white-winged flufftail and the slender-billed flufftail. They are threatened with habitat loss caused by the draining of wetlands for cultivation.

Species
Genus Sarothrura (flufftails; 9 species)
 White-spotted flufftail, Sarothrura pulchra
 Buff-spotted flufftail, Sarothrura elegans
 Red-chested flufftail, Sarothrura rufa
 Chestnut-headed flufftail, Sarothrura lugens
 Streaky-breasted flufftail, Sarothrura boehmi
 Striped flufftail, Sarothrura affinis
 Madagascar flufftail, Sarothrura insularis
 White-winged flufftail, Sarothrura ayresi
 Slender-billed flufftail, Sarothrura watersi

References

Sources
Garcia-R., Juan C., Gibb, Gillian C., Trewick, Steve A. (2014) "Deep global evolutionary radiation in birds: diversification and trait evolution in the cosmopolitan bird family Rallidae." Molecular Phylogenetics and Evolution 81, 96-108. 
Keith, Stuart; Benson, Constantine Walter; Irwin, Michael P. Stuart. (1970) "The genus Sarothrura (Aves, Rallidae)." Bulletin of the American Museum of Natural History  143 article 1 
René de Roland, Lily-Arison (2004) "Observations on nest building and courtship behaviour of the Madagascar Flufftail Sarothrura  insularis" Bulletin of the African Bird Club 11(1): 42–43. 

Sarothruridae